The Muscle Shoals SmasHers were a full-contact women's outdoor football team of the National Women's Football Association. The team officially became part of the NWFA and began playing league games in 2004.

Home games for the SmasHers were played at the Colbert County High School football stadium in Muscle Shoals, Alabama.

References

National Women's Football Association teams
Colbert County, Alabama
American football teams in Alabama
2004 establishments in Alabama
American football teams established in 2004
Women's sports in Alabama